MonarC Entertainment was an American record label formed by Mariah Carey, under Island Records. The name comes from Carey's well-documented fascination with butterflies. The only albums released with the Monarc Entertainment logo were Charmbracelet and The Remixes. In the summer of 2004, Carey reportedly shut down her MonarC label, as her subsequent releases were released under just Island Records alone.

Artists 
 Mariah Carey
 Trey Lorenz

References

See also 
 List of record labels

American record labels
Record labels disestablished in 2002
Vanity record labels
Contemporary R&B record labels
Pop record labels
Hip hop record labels
Mariah Carey